Marthinus Stephanus van der Merwe (born ) is a South African rugby union player for the  in the Pro14, the  in the Currie Cup and the  in the Rugby Challenge. His regular position is hooker.

References

South African rugby union players
Living people
1997 births
People from Mbombela
Rugby union hookers
Free State Cheetahs players
Cheetahs (rugby union) players
Rugby union players from Mpumalanga